Ivanovka is a rural locality (a selo) and the administrative center of Ivanovsky Selsoviet, Kuryinsky District, Altai Krai, Russia. The population was 796 as of 2013. There are 17 streets.

Geography 
Ivanovka is located 20 km west of Kurya (the district's administrative centre) by road. Kuznetsovo is the nearest rural locality.

References 

Rural localities in Kuryinsky District